Emanuel Hjort is a Swedish fictional character, created by Swedish writers Anders Jacobsson and Sören Olsson for a youth book series. Upon the 2000 release, the old Bert Diaries series had been completed with Berts bokslut in 1999.

Emanuel is 16 years old in the first book, and thinks even more of girls than Sune and Bert. Emanuel is also interested in photographing. His mother is named Elisabeth, and his father Roger. His 23 year old sister Emma is living in Denmark.

Books

References 

Swedish children's book series
Works by Anders Jacobsson and Sören Olsson
Book series introduced in 2000